German submarine U-126 was a Type IXC U-boat of Nazi Germany's Kriegsmarine during World War II. She was laid down at the DeSchiMAG AG Weser yard in Bremen as yard number 989 on 1 June 1940, launched on 31 December and commissioned on 22 March 1941 under Kapitänleutnant Ernst Bauer.

The submarine commenced her service with the 2nd U-boat Flotilla, an organization she would stay with, both for training and operations.

Design
German Type IXC submarines were slightly larger than the original Type IXBs. U-126 had a displacement of  when at the surface and  while submerged. She had two shafts and two  propellers.

U-126 was fitted with six  torpedo tubes (four fitted at the bow and two at the stern), 22 torpedoes, one  SK C/32 naval gun, 180 rounds, and a  SK C/30 as well as a  C/30 anti-aircraft gun. The boat had a complement of forty-eight.

Service history

First patrol
She had missed with torpedoes and decided to use her guns instead, but accurate return fire from the merchantman (many merchant ships had some form of defensive armament fitted), drove her off before she could finish the job. A week later, things improved when she sank Erato on 27 July, west of northwest Spain. She used her deck gun again to sink the schooner Robert Max on 4 August east of the Azores. She sank the Yugoslavian Sud using the deck gun once more, but in conjunction with the Italian submarine Marconi on 14 August northeast of the Azores.

Second patrol
The boat was rewarded with two sinkings on 10 October 1941 northeast of the Cape Verde islands; Nailsea Manor was carrying HMS LCT-102 as deck cargo when she was attacked.

She assisted survivors from the German commerce raider Atlantis on the 22nd.

Third patrol
The boat was also successful in early 1942 as part of Operation Drumbeat (Paukenschlag), the German assault on merchant shipping along the US coast. One ship that did not sink was Colabee. The ship ran aground after being torpedoed and abandoned with her engines still running. She was salvaged, repaired and returned to service.

Fourth patrol
The ship's master was questioned by the German sailors, but when he did not understand what was being said, the Germans fired over a lifeboat, wounding one man.

Other vessels were attacked in the area of the Caribbean and the West Indies, using torpedoes and the deck gun.

Fifth patrol
Patrol number five was the boat's longest – 111 days. The voyage took the submarine to west Africa. She was also successful in sinking New Toronto on the fifth  from Kotonou; her cargo included 75 live cows.

Sixth patrol and loss
One of U-126s victims on this patrol was Flora MacDonald, which was torpedoed on 30 May 1943 south of Freetown in Sierra Leone. The ship did not sink, but after being beached and the cargo salvaged, she burned for 16 days and was subsequently declared a total loss. The U-boat also hit Standella on 2 June. The submarine was attacked by an aircraft (the source does not give the type), off Freetown on the 15th.

The boat was sunk by a Vickers Wellington of No. 172 Squadron RAF, on 3 July 1943, off Cape Ortegal, Spain. There were no survivors from the 55 man crew.

Summary of raiding history

 Being carried aboard Nailsea Manor as deck cargo

See also
List of successful U-boats
Black May (1943)

References

Notes

Citations

Bibliography

External links

German Type IX submarines
U-boats commissioned in 1941
U-boats sunk in 1943
World War II submarines of Germany
1940 ships
World War II shipwrecks in the Atlantic Ocean
Ships built in Bremen (state)
U-boats sunk by British aircraft
Ships lost with all hands
Maritime incidents in July 1943